Modan is a Kurdish tribe mainly residing around Haymana, Ankara Province in Turkey. The tribe is claimed to have reached Haymana as early as 1184, becoming the first Kurdish tribe in the region, although the first Kurdish village and considerable Kurdish presence appeared much later in 15th and 18th centuries, respectively. Tribal members are also found in Mazandaran Province in northern Iran.

Geography 
It is believed that the tribe migrated westward from Mutki region near Bitlis. Today, they live in the villages of Katrancı, Saatli, Karasüleymanlı, Çeltikli and Toyçayırı in the Haymana district of Ankara Province. The tribe is also settled in the village of Modanlı in Elazığ Province.

See also 
 Şêxbizin (tribe)
 Reşwan (tribe)
 Kord Kola
 Kord Kheyl, Juybar

References 

Kurdish tribes
History of the Kurdish people
History of Ankara Province